Blastophaga psenes is a wasp species in the genus Blastophaga. It pollinates the common fig Ficus carica and the closely related Ficus palmata. Without a colony or nest, these wasps breed in figs and the adults live for only a few days or weeks.   They locate the fig they wish to pollinate through olfactory senses.

Taxonomy and phylogenetics 
Mutualism occurs between fig and fig wasps, which creates a need for specific species of figs to be pollinated by specific species of wasps. The origin of mutualism is also the beginning of the fig wasp phylogeny. In the phylogenetic tree, the genus of Blastophaga and Wiebesia are very similar. Both of these genera pollinate Ficus species of figs.

Description and identification 
B. psenes are small wasps, approximately only  in length. The females are black wasps and seem shiny while the males are smaller than females. While males are wingless, females have wings that are transparent and very thin. Yet females' wings and antennae detach as they enter the opening of a fig. Upon dissecting a fig, one can see the wings of the wasps at the opening of the fig and adult wasps, larvae, and eggs are found within the fig. Because these wasps are free-living, they only live for a few days or weeks.

Distribution and habitat 
Because B. psenes relies on Ficus carica to breed, it is found in regions where this fig species grows. These wasps' native range is in the Palaearctic, including Southern Europe near the Mediterranean Basin. B. psenes has been introduced on other continents to ensure that Ficus carica bear fruit there.

Life cycle 
Adult B. psenes only live for a few days or weeks, and at maximum, much less than a month. These wasps lay fertilized eggs in female flowers of the syconium of a F. carica fig. When the larvae hatch, they develop in the fig ovaries, creating a gall.  The larvae become adults around the same time male fig flowers are ready to produce pollen. When an adult wasp is mature, it mates with another wasp within the syconium.  After mating, females emerge from the fig and search for a new nearby fig in which to lay their eggs. The female then oviposits into a new syconium.  From there, the short life cycle of a B. psenes continues.

Mutualism 

Each species of fig is pollinated by a specific species of fig wasp. This idea leads to the concept of fig-fig wasp mutualism. While the fig wasp uses the fig as a “nest” and a location to lay their eggs and for the brood to develop, the fig uses the wasps as the method of pollination for the figs and fig flowers.  As previously stated, B. psenes has a mutualist relationship with the fig species F. carica.  This fig can only be pollinated by the symbiotic wasp who has retrieved pollen from another syconium. Female wasps oviposit into the syconium for hatching. When these larvae emerge as adults, they carry pollen that they accumulated in the syconium out of the fig. Wasps usually oviposit into a nearby syconium. When they oviposit, they are also pollinating that syconium. There is a major difference between male and female fig trees.

Male trees 

Male trees contain female flowers with short styles. Due to the fact that wasps do not have very long ovipositors, they can only parasitize ovaries of these female flowers with short styles which are only found on male trees. All female flowers on male trees with parasitized ovaries with wasp eggs produce larva and no seeds. All female flowers on male tree with ovaries that are not parasitized with wasp eggs will produce seeds and will help pollination and reproduction of that flower.

Female trees 

On the other hand, female flowers on female trees have long styles. Therefore, these wasps cannot parasitize these ovaries because their ovipositors are too short to reach the bottom of the syconium.  Because of this lack of depositing eggs in these female flowers, all female flowers on female trees produce seeds and none produce larva. Also, it is near impossible for wasps to emerge from a fig if they cannot perform oviposition.  This leads to the trend that female trees are lethal since wasps are stuck in that syconium.

Winter versus spring caprifigs 
There is also a difference in winter and spring caprifigs (male figs) and the time course for becoming available for receiving eggs and being pollinated. Spring caprifigs usually produce more wasps than winter caprifigs do because of the better and more available resources of the spring caprifigs compared to the winter caprifigs. This also implies that the fig wasp population is much more active and larger in the spring. The spring and winter caprifigs have a cycle related to each other as to maximize resources and output of figs and wasps. Winter, or delayed, caprifigs usually occur on male trees. Spring, or undelayed, caprifigs usually occur on female trees.  Because female trees are lethal, wasps prefer these delayed caprifigs of male trees.

Chemoattraction 
Once wasps emerge from the syconium, they have to figure out how to get to the fig in which they want to deposit their eggs.  Not only that, they need to make sure that the fig they find is available and acceptable for breeding. In the case of B. psenes, olfactory stimuli drive the wasp to a fig that is available to receive wasp eggs.  Figs emit compounds that the wasps can sense.  Pentane extracts from figs which are in their receptive-phase will attract B. psenes from at least 5 meters.  Upon sensing these signals from a specific syconium, the wasp will approach that fig.  The wasps assess the figs before entrance.  They do this by holding up their heads and antennae next to the opening of the syconium (the ostiole).  The actual attractive substances come from the ostiole.  If a wasp detects the signal, it will lower its antennae and will search for the entrance to the fig.  Both smell and taste also help actual entrance into a fig once the desired fig has been located.  If the wasp does not detect a signal, it will not enter the fig.  Instead, it will move on and search for another receptive fig.  Because these wasps have such short lives, selection has favored this attraction towards receptive plants to be easily distinguishable from a few meters.  Due to the difference in male and female trees, male tree figs are more attractive than female tree figs as caused by selection. This olfactory stimulus is specific for the wasps' host fig (in this case, F. carica), and enables the wasps to distinguish between their host and other fig species.

Mating 
Males emerge first and start seeking females to mate with. Sometimes mating occurs before the female has finished emerging from its cocoon. Then, males start enlarging the fig's opening. Some fall from the fig to the ground. They have no wings and die shortly after. The enlarged opening enables the females to leave the syconium in search of a new one where to oviposit. Mating occurs within the syconium and laying eggs occurs in a syconium different than the one where mating occurred.

Kin selection

Kin 
The wasps breed inside the fig. Later, the female lays its eggs in the ovaries of another fig by sticking its ovipositor in each flower's style. This can lead to some flowers not being pollinated because some styles are too long.  Each larva from a deposited egg destroys a female flower when it feeds on its growing seed. When wasps emerge from the syconium, they rush to the nearest syconia.  This rush creates a large number of wasps all competing to enter an adjacent syconium.  Due to this rush, pollination will become less effective as more pollen falls off of the wasp bodies.  Offspring number depends on number of pollinator wasps per syconium.  The number of offspring is low when the entry number of wasps in a syconium is high.  On average, each wasp has 3 broods a year; one for each of the different seasonal caprifigs.  Also, reproductive success depends heavily on transmission of strong signals by plant.

Interactions with other species

Diet 
When they are hatched, B. psenes larvae feed on hyperplastic floret tissue. The mother produces this hyperplastic tissue when she lays the eggs in the syconium.

Predation 
One of the main predators of these wasps is ants.  Ants find these wasps using chemical signals such as odor cues. The ants use the fig-fig wasp mutualism to find the fig wasps by detecting an odor that comes from the figs of the male trees.  They know that most fig wasps are located on male fig trees, so they use that relationship to prey on wasps.  This concept is called associative learning of odor because the ants are indirectly finding these wasps by associating the smell of the fig with the wasps.  However, some ants do not respond to the odor of figs for different reasons.  For instance, the fig could be a non-pollinator and therefore not release any chemical substance.  In the case where the ants cannot detect odors, the wasps will not be predated upon.

Parasitism 
B. psenes are parasitized by a nematode Schistonchus caprifici. These parasites are carried in the hemocoel of the female wasp. When a B. psenes wasp oviposits her egg inside the syconium, nematodes are also deposited. These nematodes then invade, feed, and reproduce inside the floret tissues.  Larvae finish development with nematode still inside the hemocoel. After fertilization, females emerge from a syconium with nematodes still in hemocoel along with pollen flakes along her body.  Because this nematode is primarily found in the hemocoel of a female wasp, males are not associated with nematodes. B. psenes is a very efficient host of these nematodes.

Cleptoparasitism 

B. psenes also has a cleptoparasite, Philotrypesis caricae.  The cleptoparasite is actually another wasp. By being a cleptoparasite, P. caricae allows B. psenes to do the work and acquire food with little or no cost to itself. B. psenes wasps oviposit in the syconium, while P. caricae oviposit at the outside of the florets. This layering of ovipositing causes the larvae of P. caricae to put pressure on the larvae B. psenes wasps so that B. psenes cannot emerge from the syconium. B. psenes struggles to compete for food with P. caricae so it usually dies when cleptoparasitized.  While the nematodes as parasites are not lethal to B. psenes, these cleptoparasites are lethal because they are taking B. psenes all the food source instead of sharing the food like the nematodes.

Disease 
Some wasps can carry a disease that is carried by F. carica trees.  This disease is a fungus called Fusarium moniliforme, or fig endosepsis.  The wasps carry this disease on their wings and body. Because the fungus grows on the ostiole, the fungus is transmitted to the wasps'  bodies when the wasp emerges from the syconium through the ostiole.  Fig endosepsis is not transmitted transovarily by the fig wasp.  The wasps become contaminated with spores of the fungus as they contact plant surfaces upon emergence.  Studies show that wasps on upper surfaces of the leaves were infected with this fungus in higher levels than other wasps. Wasps who were higher up in the tree or further out on a branch also showed more fungus on their wings and bodies. This led to the conclusion that contamination increases as the wasps walk on leaves, petioles, and fruits before they reach the opening to the syconium. This fungus affects both males and females.  The fungus shows to be more evident in spring caprifigs that are pollinated with 5 to 10 winter caprifigs than when spring caprifigs are pollinated with only one winter caprifig. Also, the incidences of this fungus are higher when there is a high population of wasps with limited figs.  The more wasps that pass through one ostiole, the more likely the wasp will contract F. moniliforme.

References

External links 

Agaonidae
Wasps described in 1758
Taxa named by Carl Linnaeus